Arctiin is a lignan found in many plants of the family Asteraceae, particularly the greater burdock (Arctium lappa) and Centaurea imperialis, and in Trachelospermum asiaticum, Saussurea heteromalla, and  Forsythia viridissima. It is the glucoside of arctigenin.

Arctiin and arctigenin have shown anticancer effects in animal research. They have been found to act as agonists of the adiponectin receptor 1.

References

External links 
 Arctiin entry in the public domain NCI Dictionary of Cancer Terms

Adiponectin receptor agonists
Lignan glucosides
O-methylated natural phenols
Lactones